WJCR-FM (90.1 FM) is a Southern Gospel music radio station that is licensed to Upton, Kentucky, United States, and serves the Elizabethtown and Glasgow, Kentucky areas. The station is currently owned by FM 90.1, Inc. and features programming from Salem Communications.

The broadcast facilities of WJCR are located at 13101 Raider Hollow Road in rural northwest Hart County off Kentucky Route 224 between Upton and Millerstown.

History
The station's construction permit was issued on October 18, 1989, under the callsign WJCR. The station actually signed on the air in February 1990.

Until 2015, the station's programming was also available in full via Paducah, Kentucky-licensed WNFC. In 2015, WNFC became a full-time affiliate of the Somerset, Kentucky-based King of Kings Radio Network.

References

External links

Radio stations established in 1990
Southern Gospel radio stations in the United States
JCR-FM
Hardin County, Kentucky